Beneath the Tamarind Tree styled as  Beneath the Tamarind Tree — A Story of Courage, Family, and the Lost Schoolgirls of Boko Haram is a 2019 non-fiction social novel by Isha Sesay. The novel was written when Sesay was a journalist at CNN International. It gave the details about the 2014 Chibok schoolgirls kidnapping by Boko Haram.

Reference

2019 Nigerian novels
Boko Haram
HarperCollins books